Henri Jean Marie Dozolme (21 May 1899 – 2 February 1976) was a French shot putter. He competed at the 1920 Summer Olympics and placed 15th.

References

1899 births
1976 deaths
French male shot putters
Athletes (track and field) at the 1920 Summer Olympics
Olympic athletes of France